The Haaniidae are a new (2019) family of praying mantids, based on the type genus Haania.  The first use of "Haaniidae" was by Giglio-Tos and it was revived as part of a major revision of mantid taxonomy; genera in the subfamily Haaniinae havie been moved here from the family Thespidae.

The new placement is in superfamily Haanioidea (of group Cernomantodea) and infraorder Schizomantodea.  Genera in this family have been recorded from: India, Indochina and Malesia through to New Guinea.

Subfamilies, tribes and genera  
The Mantodea Species File lists two subfamilies:

Caliridinae 
 Caliris Giglio-Tos, 1915
 Gildella Giglio-Tos, 1915

Haaniinae 
tribe Arriini
 Arria  Stal, 1877
 Sinomiopteryx Tinkham, 1937
tribe Haaniini
 Astape Stal, 1877
 Haania Saussure, 1871

References

External links 

Mantodea families